The rainbow shiner (Notropis chrosomus) is a North American species of ray-finned fish in the genus Notropis.

The rainbow shiner has a length of 5 to 8 centimeters. It has translucent color from pink to golden with a silver-black stripe along its flanks. The base of its fins are of a reddish color. Adult males change their color during the mating period. Their ventral fins become blue, their head turns purple and their nose turns red.

The rainbow shiner was originally endemic to the Mobile River system, where it can be found in small clear rivers of drainage areas of the Alabama, Coosa and Black Warrior rivers in particular. Now it also appears in some rivers in Tennessee and is a popular pet fish for aquariums and ponds.

The rainbow shiner spawns between May and June.

Introduction 
This species of fish is usually found in small streams along river drainages of Northwest Georgia, Northeastern Alabama, and as more recent research suggests, southwest Tennessee. N. chrosomus is a freshwater, benthopelagic fish that inhabits riffles and pools with gravelly bottoms in creeks and small rivers and are usually found accompanied by species of Campostoma. They are mainly insectivorous and although studies show the predominant prey of N. chrosomus come from the family Chironomidae, they are found to be more opportunistic feeders and are not very selective. The maximum age is typically two years for both sexes and sexual maturity occurs at one year of age. N. chrosomus increase their food intake during the late winter and spring months before spawning in order to meet the increased energy needs for gamete production and sexual reproduction. Hybridization has been observed between N. baileyi and N. chrosomus in areas where N. chilitious populations have been introduced. There is limited information available pertaining to the current and past management of N. chrosomus. What is known, is that this species was once endemic to parts of northern Alabama and populations have spread further north to Tennessee within recent decades. The latitudinal movement northward may be of particular interest to researchers since N. chrosomus favors warmer waters.

Geographic distribution 
The native range of the rainbow shiner consists of the Mobile Bay basin, including the Coosa, Cahaba, and Alabama River drainages. This species is known from, and was possibly introduced into the Black Warrior River system. These reports however, have been questioned recently based on the fact that this species is typically found in streams with limestone outcrops in the watershed. N. chrosomus is found along the southeast edge of the Black Warrior River system consisting of streams that have headwaters in limestone formations. N. chrosomus is also known from, and may have been introduced into, tributaries of the Tennessee River, including Town Creek in northern Alabama and the South Chickamauga Creek system in north Georgia. The means of their introduction is unknown but it is hypothesized that it was by bait bucket release.

Ecology 
Notropis chrosomus is typically found in small, low-turbidity headwater streams flowing over gravelly and sandy riffles and pools but can also be found in springs and small, clear streams. N. chrosomus inhabit freshwater benthopelagic habitats in temperate waters. It is typical that rainbow shiners co-occur with Fundulus stellifer (also considered to have been introduced by recent accidental bait bucket introductions) in small streams. N. chrosomus are considered opportunistic insectivores. Over 80% of food items preyed on are invertebrates, the bulk of which are aquatic and terrestrial insects. Studies show gut contents largely consisting largely of Chironomidae larvae, unidentified insect parts, unidentified Diptera adults, and Collembola.
Notropis chrosomus is considered a disturbance sensitive species, however, their percent occurrence in the Upper Cahaba River (an area recently plagued with urban construction and habitat disturbance) has nearly doubled. Populations increased from 6.5% in 1983 to 12.5% in 1995 as opposed to other disturbance-sensitive species also found in the Upper Cahaba River such as Cyprinella callistia, Etheostoma jordani, and Percina brevicauda whose populations significantly decreased within the same time span.

Life history 
Average adults reach 1.6 to 2.4 inches in length. Growth rates of N. chrosomus increase in spring in both length and weight in individuals who are one or two years of age. Mean age in months differs between sexes. Males live an average of 11.7 months whereas females typically live 13.5 months. The maximum age for males is around 23 months and 25 months for females. Sexual maturity typically occurs by 12 months of age for most individuals with the exception of a few that will become sexually mature by 24 months of age. The maximum age is a little over 24 months and sexual maturity occurs in most individuals by 12 months of age, suggesting that there are no more than two spawning seasons for any individual. Spawning occurs in  waters in late spring/early summer. N. chrosomus spawn in habits similar to those used throughout the year but egg deposition usually occurs in Semotilus sp. nests and Nocomis sp. nests. Rainbow shiners increase food intake during late winter and early spring which coincides with the increase in growth experienced in the spring months before the spawning season and also precedes the increased energy requirements of gamete production and courtship behaviors.

Current management 
Currently, N. chrosomus is a species of relatively low conservation concern and does not require significant additional protection or management, monitoring or research action. However, a detailed recovery plan for the Mobile River Basin aquatic ecosystem, to which N. chrosomus is native, is underway. The plan was created by the U. S. Fish and Wildlife Service and aims to protect the Basin's native aquatic fauna and flora through aquatic ecosystem management. The decline of many other aquatic species within the Basin is a result of increasing human populations, modifications to meet their needs, and impacts of current land use. Human populations and their associated needs for housing, recreation, and agricultural products is projected to increase within the Basin. The recovery plan therefore seeks to emphasize stewardship responsibilities shared by all inhabitants of the Basin by promoting three basic tenets:
1.	Use to the fullest practical extent existing laws, regulations, and policies to protect listed populations and to develop a stream management strategy that places high priority on conservation and restoration. 
2.	Encourage voluntary stewardship through joint initiatives and individual actions as the only practical and economical means of minimizing adverse effects of private land use and activities within watersheds.
3.	Continue to promote research efforts on life histories, sensitivities, and requirements of imperiled aquatic species, and develop technological capabilities to maintain and propagate them.
By seeking to improve habitat conditions within the Basin, it is likely that populations of N. chrosomus will continue to remain stable or increase with these improvements.

References 

 Robert Jay Goldstein, Rodney W. Harper, Richard Edwards: American Aquarium Fishes. Texas A&M University Press 2000, p. 109
Leo Nico. 2010. Notropis chrosomus. USGS Nonindigenous Aquatic Species Database, Gainesville, FL.<https://nas.er.usgs.gov/queries/FactSheet.asp?speciesID=592> Revision Date: 12/5/2003
Bart, H. L., M. F. Cashner, and K. R. Piller. 2011. Phylogenetic relationships of the North American cyprinid subgenus hydropholax. Molecular Phylogenetics and Evolution 59:725-735.
Holder, D. S. and S. L. Powers. 2010. Life-history aspects of the rainbow shiner, Notropis chrosomus (Teleostei: Cyprinidae), in northern Georgia. Southeastern Naturalist 9:347-358.
Johnston, C. E. and K. J. Kleiner. 1994. Reproductive behavior of the rainbow shiner ("Notropis chrosomus") and the rough shiner ("Notropis baileye"), nest associates of the bluehead chub ("Nocomis leplocephalus") (Pisces: Cyprinidae) in the Alabama River drainage. Journal of the Alabama Academy of Science 65:230-238.
Olson, Adric Delray. 2012. Life history traits of the mirror shiner, "Notropis spectrunculus", in western North Carolina. Doctoral dissertation, Western Carolina University.
 Onorato, D., R. A. Angus, and K. R. Marion. 2000. Historical changes in the icthyofaunal assemblages of the upper Cahaba River in Alabama associated with extensive urban development in the watershed. Journal of Freshwater Ecology 15:7-63.
NatureServe 2013. Notropis chrosomus. In: IUCN 2013. IUCN Red List of Threatened Species. Version 2013.2. <www.iucnredlist.org>.
 Froese, Rainer 2013. Notropis chrosomus. http://www.fishbase.org/summary/2848
Fishes of Alabama and the Mobile Basin 2013. Notropis chrosomus. https://web.archive.org/web/20140206222049/http://www.outdooralabama.com/fishing/freshwater/fish/other/minnow/shiner/rainbow/
U.S. Fish and Wildlife Service, and Mobile River Basin Coalition Planning Committee, comps. Recovery Plan for Mobile River Basin Aquatic Ecosystem. Rep. N.p.: n.p., n.d. Www.fws.gov. Web.

External links 
 Rainbow shiner - picture on a website of Samford University
 Eric Brodock:  Rainbow Shinher - article in Finformation (volume 62, issue 2), a magazin of the Greater Pittsburgh Aquarium Society
 Notropis chrosomus - Video on YouTube

Notropis
Freshwater fish of the United States
Taxa named by David Starr Jordan
Fish described in 1877